The Catholics are an Australian jazz ensemble led by Lloyd Swanton on acoustic and electric bass guitar, percussion and piano (ex-Dynamic Hepnotics). Other long-term members include Sandy Evans on tambourine, tenor and soprano saxophones, and James Greening on trombone. They have been nominated for ARIA Awards for Best Jazz Album in 1994 (The Catholics), 1997 (Life on Earth) and 2000 (Barefoot). Swanton is also a member of a jazz trio, the Necks; Evans was also in Ten Part Invention and has released solo material.

Members

 Dave Brewer – electric and acoustic guitar, drums, güiro
 Sandy Evans – tenor and soprano saxophone, tambourine
 Waldo Fabian – electric bass guitar, percussion
 James Greening – trombone
 Sammila Sithole – congas, bongos, timbales
 Lloyd Swanton – acoustic and electric bass guitar, percussion, piano, shaker, tambourine
 Toby Hall – drums, surdo, timbales
 Michael Rose – pedal steel guitar, shaker, dobro, mandolin
 Fabian Hevia – percussion
 Gary Daley –
 Hamish Stuart – drums
 Jonathan Pease – guitar
 Bruce Reid – steel and lap steel guitar

Discography

Awards and nominations

ARIA Awards
The ARIA Music Awards are presented annually since 1987 by the Australian Recording Industry Association (ARIA).

|-
| 1994 || The Catholics || ARIA Award for Best Jazz Album || 
|-
| 1997 || Life On Earth || Best Jazz Album ||   
|-
| 2000 || Barefoot ||Best Jazz Album ||  
|}

Mo Awards
The Australian Entertainment Mo Awards (commonly known informally as the Mo Awards), were annual Australian entertainment industry awards. They recognise achievements in live entertainment in Australia from 1975 to 2016. They won one award in that time.
 (wins only)
|-
| 1994
| The Catholics
| Jazz Group of the Year
| 
|-

References

Australian jazz ensembles